is a stratovolcano located in western Aomori Prefecture, Tohoku, Japan.

Mount Iwaki is listed as one of the 100 Famous Japanese Mountains in a 1964 book by mountaineer and author Kyūya Fukada. The mountain and its surroundings are located within the borders of Tsugaru Quasi-National Park.

Name
There are various theories about the origin of the name "Iwaki". Yet another theory is that the name Iwaki is an archaic way of saying "stone castle" .

In addition to being called Mount Iwaki, the mountain is also widely nicknamed , and less frequently , due its conical shape that bears similarity to Mount Fuji. It was also dubbed "Peak Tilesius" in honor of German naturalist, Wilhelm Gottlieb Tilesius von Tilenau in 1805 by Adam Johann von Krusenstern during the first Russian circumnavigation of the Earth, though this name had dropped out of use among Westerners by 1858 in favor of its native name.

Geographic setting and description

Geology
Mount Iwaki is a roughly symmetrical andesitic stratovolcano, rising in relative isolation from the plains at the base of Tsugaru Peninsula. Its summit crater is two kilometers wide, and it has three lava domes on the western and southern flanks. The mountain has been active frequently in historic times, with very frequent activity consisting mostly of small to moderate phreatic explosions during the Edo period. The volcano's last known eruption was on 23 March 1863. Hirosaki University has maintained an observatory with 18 telemetering stations on the mountain since 1981.

Outdoor recreation

Climbing

Mount Iwaki's summit, at 1625 meters, can be reached only by hiking, but the length and duration of the hike depends on the route. From , it takes approximately four hours to hike to the top.  The trail starts from inside the shrine, before the large gates on the left. The easier and more popular route follows Tsugaru Iwaki Skyline, a tolled road, up to a lift. The skyline road starts from Aomori Prefecture Route 3 on the southwest side of Mount Iwaki. At the end of the road there is a chair lift. From the top of the chair lift it takes around 30–40 minutes to hike to the mountain's summit.

See also 
 Iwakiyama Jinja
 Tsugaru Quasi-National Park
 Shirakami-Sanchi
 List of volcanoes in Japan
 List of mountains in Japan

References

External links

   - Japan Meteorological Agency
 Iwakisan - Smithsonian Institution: Global Volcanism Program

Volcanoes of Honshū
Stratovolcanoes of Japan
Mountains of Aomori Prefecture
Volcanoes of Aomori Prefecture
Ajigasawa, Aomori
Hirosaki
Hanami spots of Japan
Mountain faith
Holocene stratovolcanoes